Valsaceae is a family of sac fungi in the Diaporthales order.

Genera

Amphiporthe 
Apioplagiostoma 
Apioporthella 
Chadefaudiomyces 
Cryptascoma 
Cytospora 
Diaporthella 
Ditopellina 
Durispora 
Hypospilina 
Kapooria 
Leptosillia 
Leucostoma 
Maculatipalma 
Paravalsa 
Phomopsis 
Phruensis 
Rossmania 
Torsellia Fr. 1849
Valsa 
Valsella

References

Diaporthales
Fungus families
Taxa named by Edmond Tulasne
Taxa described in 1861